Zaradust-e Khuragen was the leader of a branch of Zoroastrianism called Dorostdini and teacher of Mazdak, leader of Mazdakism. Dorostdini was the roots of Mazdakism Emphasis on the use of wisdom instead of religious laws.  He was from Fasa and for many years he lived in the Byzantine Empire.

References

Iranian Zoroastrians

Date of birth unknown
Date of death unknown
6th-century Iranian people